The 5"/31 caliber gun (spoken "five-inch-thirty-one-caliber") were used in the secondary batteries of the United States Navy's "New Navy" protected cruiser  and later mounted in  during the Spanish–American War.

Design
Mark 1, Nos. 1 and 2, were 31 calibers and two of the first steel tube guns that were built entirely in the United States. They were trunnioned guns, no liners and that fired bag ammunition. After the Spanish–American War was over they were modified to Mod 1 in 1901. A liner was inserted in the breech end and the trunnions were cut off. The Mod 1 consisted of tube, jacket, and 9 hoops. After these changes the gun was able to use the same ammunition as the later Mark 2 5-inch gun.

Naval Service

References

External links
 
 
 Bluejackets Manual, 1917, 4th revision: US Navy 14-inch Mark 1 gun

Naval guns of the United States
127 mm artillery